Shobnom Bubly is a Bangladeshi film actress and news anchor who started her career as a television news presenter. She made her acting debut in the film Bossgiri with Shakib Khan, and since then the two have collaborated multiple times.

Early life

Bubly was born in Dhaka, Bangladesh. She is the third of four children. Her father is a retired Armed Police (APBN) Officer and her mother is a housewife. One of her elder sisters, Naznin Mimi, is a playback singer and the other one, Sharmin Sweety, is a former news presenter. Her only brother, Jahid Hasan Akash, is a student.
Bubly completed her bachelor's in economics from National University and was also reportedly enrolled in an evening MBA program at the Dhaka University. Inspired by her elder sister's stint as a news presenter, she auditioned for the Banglavision television channel and was selected as a news anchor in 2013.

Career
In 2013, Bubly began her career as a news presenter in the Bangladeshi private entertainment television channel Banglavision. She eventually became interested in acting and debuted with the film Bossgiri with Shakib Khan.

Personal life 
In 2016, Shakib Khan and Bubly were rumored to be dating while shooting for the film Bossgiri. There were strong rumours that they were married, but it was unconfirmed at the time. On 30 September 2022, Shakib and Bubly both confirmed on Facebook that they have been married since 2018 and together they have a son named Shehzad Khan Bir who was born on 21 March 2020, in the United States.

Filmography

Awards

Meril Prothom Alo Awards

Channel i Digital Media Award

Iconic Star Awards

References

External links
 
 

Living people
People from Dhaka
Bangladeshi film actresses
21st-century Bangladeshi actresses
Year of birth missing (living people)